Andrew Henry Bayly  (born 1962) is a New Zealand politician who was elected to the New Zealand Parliament at the 2014 general election as the MP for Hunua and a representative of the New Zealand National Party.

Personal life
Bayly was born in Wanganui and has a twin brother. Bayly attended Wanganui Collegiate School and graduated with a degree in Accounting & Finance from Massey University. He is a Chartered Accountant and a Fellow of the NZ Institute of Management, the NZ Chartered Institute of Corporate Management and the UK Chartered Association of Certified Accountants. He is also a Fellow of the Royal Geographical Society in London. Bayly was an officer in the New Zealand Army Territorials and also served in the British Parachute Regiment.

In the 1970s, while a student, Bayly accidentally shot his brother in the leg while climbing a fence with a gun. While his brother was left with heavy scarring, his leg was saved.

Bayly had a long career in adventure racing, including competing in three Coast-to-Coast events, marathons and Ironman events. More recently he took up mountaineering, having scaled many mountain peaks, including Aoraki Mt Cook and Mt. Aspiring, and four mountains in Antarctica, including Vinson Massif, the highest mountain in Antarctica. In the summer of 2012/13 he dragged a sled 112 km to the South Pole. In 2016 he and his eldest son James each dragged sledges 120 km to the North Pole, raising $10,000 for the Kokako Bird Recovery Programme in the Hunua Ranges.

In January 2019, Bayly and his second son Daniel spent a month trekking 500 km through Jordan on camels, retracing the routes of Lawrence of Arabia when he worked with Arab forces during the First World War, as described in his book, Seven Pillars of Wisdom. 

Living and eating as a Bedouin, Bayly was able to confirm a number of the claims made by Lawrence. However, Bayly disputed Lawrence’s claim that he could ride his camels up to 80 to 120 miles a day. Taking into account the time involved in collecting firewood and cooking and time for prayers, Bayly’s experience was that a fully laden camel could ably cover up to 50 to 80 km in a day, but only for a few days at most. Bayly’s article about their experience was published in the T.E. Lawrence Society journal, August 2019 edition.

Business career
Bayly worked as a merchant banker, founding the Cranleigh firm with his brother Paul, where he offered corporate advisory and capital markets advice to a range of government entities, local authorities and corporate clients. Cranleigh has offices in New Zealand, Australia and Singapore.

He was a director of numerous companies, the chair of the board of New Zealand Financial Planning and a trustee of the Enterprise Franklin Development Trust, the economic development arm of the Franklin Council.

Bayly is a former director of Envirofert, an organic compost product company that received the prestigious “Green Ribbon Award” in 2010 for making an outstanding contribution to protecting the environment. Envirofert receives around 60,000 tonnes of green waste and building products every year, and turns most of it into beneficial products, including compost and gypsum. It also has a partnership with Fonterra to process and recycle its waste products.

Political career

Fifth National Government, 2014–2017
During the 2014 general election Bayly was elected to Parliament as the National MP for the Hunua electorate with a majority of 17,376 votes. He replaced Paul Hutchison, who retired. He had the fourth highest majority of all electorate seats in New Zealand. During the 51st New Zealand Parliament, Bayly served as a member of the Finance and Expenditure Select Committee, Transport and Industrial Relations Select Committee, and Deputy Chair of the Regulations Review Select Committee.

In September 2016, Bayly introduced a private member's bill to Parliament that would give landlords more power to test and remedy their rental properties of dangerous levels of methamphetamine contamination. The bill, which was backed by the National Party caucus, would place an obligation on the landlord to provide rental accommodation free of methamphetamine contamination while giving them more power to confront the problem in their properties.

During the 2017 general election, Bayly retained Hunua by a margin of 19,443 votes.

Sixth Labour Government, 2017–present
In September 2019, Bayly was ejected from Parliament for attempting to disrupt Parliamentary proceedings by asking several questions about the Ihumātao dispute's implications for treaty settlements in New Zealand.

For the 2020 general election, Bayly's electorate of Hunua was renamed Port Waikato, with a new region made partly of the old Hunua electorate and partly of the old Waikato electorate. Bayly contested Port Waikato and was re-elected by a margin of 4,313 votes.

After a shadow cabinet reshuffle on 11 November 2020, Bayly was promoted to number 3 in the National Party rankings and was made Shadow Treasurer and the National Party spokesperson for infrastructure and statistics. This was a promotion of 14 places in National's shadow cabinet, and Bayly was described by reporters as "relatively unknown" and "little-known".

Bayly has been a member of Parliament’s Finance and Expenditure Select Committee since 2014 and is co-chairperson of the New Zealand - Middle East and Africa Parliamentary Friendship Group. Bayly also established the cross-party Parliament Antarctic Group in 2020 and is currently its co-chair.

On 10 November 2021, the New Zealand Superannuation and Retirement Income (Fair Residency) Amendment Bill was passed. This was the second of Bayly’s members’ bills to be passed, which is a rarity for an MP in opposition.

Following the appointment of Christopher Luxon as party leader on 30 November 2021 and a subsequent reshuffle of the shadow cabinet in early December, Bayly was made the National Party’s spokesperson for Revenue, Small Business, Commerce and Consumer Affairs, Building and Construction, and Manufacturing.

References

External links
 

|-

1962 births
Living people
New Zealand National Party MPs
Members of the New Zealand House of Representatives
New Zealand MPs for North Island electorates
New Zealand Army officers
People educated at Whanganui Collegiate School
British Parachute Regiment soldiers
New Zealand bankers
New Zealand accountants
Fellows of the Royal Geographical Society
21st-century New Zealand politicians
Candidates in the 2017 New Zealand general election